Jadwiga Zlotorzycka (1926–2002) was a Polish entomologist specialising in Mallophaga.
She worked in the Parasitology Department of the University of Wroclaw.

Works
Partial list
With M. Modrzejewska, 1988. Katalog Fauny Polski. Mallophaga. In Polish.
Catalogue of the Polish parasitic fauna. Part IV. Bird Parasites. Fascicle 3. Parasitic Arthropods. (PNW) Polish Scientific Publishers (1990)

Further reading
 Lonc Elżbieta, Profesor Jadwiga Złotorzycka: Jej wkład w naukę, życie uczelni oraz działalność Polskiego Towarzystwa Parazytologicznego. Wiad. Parazyt. 1998 z.1 s.114–128.
 Okulewicz Anna, Prof.zw.dr hab.Jadwiga Złotorzycka (1926–2002): (wspomnienie pośmiertne). Wiad. Parazyt. 2003 z.1 s.111–112.
 Lonc Elżbieta, Bibliografia prac Jadwigi Złotorzyckiej. Wiad. Parazyt. 1998 z.1 s.114–128.
  [On the 65th birthday of Jadwiga Zlotorzycka]. Angew Parasitol. 1991 Nov;32(4):228-30.

Polish entomologists
Women entomologists
1926 births
2002 deaths
Academic staff of the University of Wrocław
20th-century Polish zoologists